Castlebay Community School is a bilingual Gaelic/English school for ages 3–18 on the Scottish island of Barra.

In September 2007, it hosted a major tribute to sailors who sailed in the Merchant Navy from the Western Isles and around the world. Such tributes included various plays, traditional highland dancing, tours around ships used by the Merchant Navy and a fly past by the RAF. Representatives from Her Majesty's Armed Forces around the world were also present.

References 

Barra
Secondary schools in the Outer Hebrides
Primary schools in the Outer Hebrides
Scottish Gaelic-language secondary schools